Zvenyhorod Principality was a historical state which existed in the XI-XIII centuries on the west of modern Ukraine with the capital in Zvenyhorod. In 1349, Principality became part of Polish Kingdom.

History 
Around the year of 1084, the principalities of Zvenyhorod, Terebovlia and Peremyshl were founded within the Principality of Volhynia. Zvenyhorod went to Volodar Rostyslavych, the others to his brothers.

In 1141 the principality united with Peremyshl and Terebovlia.

In 1239 the area was subordinated to the Golden Horde. In 1349 the principality went under control of Kingdom of Poland, then became part of it in 1392.

See also 
 List of rulers of Galicia and Volhynia

External links 
 Ипатьевская летопись. В лето 6652
 Галицко-Волынская летопись
 Іван КРИП’ЯКЕВИЧ. ГАЛИЦЬКО-ВОЛИНСЬКЕ КНЯЗІВСТВО

References 
 "Енциклопедія українознавства", T. 2, Lwów 2000, s. 766, 

Political history of Ukraine
Former principalities
Historical regions in Ukraine
Zvenyhorod